Nathdwara is city of Shreenathji (Swarup of Krishna) in the Rajsamand district of the state of Rajasthan, India. It is located in the Aravalli hills, on the banks of the Banas River and is 48 kilometres north-east of Udaipur. Shrinathji,  is a swarup of lord Krishna which resembles his 7-year-old "infant" incarnation of Krishna. The deity was originally worshiped at Mathura and was shifted in the 1672 from Govardhan hill, near Mathura along holy river Yamuna after being retained at Agra for almost six months. Literally, Nathdwara means 'Gateway to Shrinathji (God)'. Nathdwara is a significant Vaishnavite shrine pertaining to the Pushti Marg or the Vallabh Sampradaya or the Shuddha Advaita founded by Vallabha Acharya, revered mainly by people of Gujarat and Rajasthan, among others. Vitthal Nathji, son of Vallabhacharya institutionalised the worship of Shrinathji at Nathdwara. Today also the Royal king family of Nathdwara belongs to the lineage of vallabhacharya mahaprabhuji. They are called Tilkayat or tikaet of Nathdwara.

Shrinathji Temple

The shrine at Nathdwara was built in the 17th century at the spot as exactly ordained by Shrinathji himself. The idol of the Lord Krishna was being transferred from Vrindaban to protect it from the Mughal ruler Aurangzeb. When the idol reached the spot at village Sihad or Sinhad, the wheels of bullock cart in which the idol was being transported sank axle-deep in mud and could not be moved any further. The accompanying priests realised that the particular place was the Lord's chosen spot and accordingly, a temple was built there under the rule and protection of the then Maharana Raj Singh of Mewar. Shrinathji Temple is also known as 'Haveli of Shrinathji' (mansion).

Other Temples
•Shri Navneetpriyaji Mandir- Shri navneet priyaji is a prominent swarup of pushtimarg. Navneet priyaji is considered as moving form of Shrinathji and is the personal  Thakurji of Gusaiji. People believe that the person who visits Nathdwara for darshan of Shrinathji must visit shri Navneet priyaji temple. The current head of the temple is The Tilkayat Maharaj of Shrinathji Temple.

•Shri vitthalnathji mandir- It is 2nd peeth or gaadi of pushtimarg of vallabh sect. It is mainly known for self manifested deity shri vitthalnathji. It is a beautiful temple with rajasthani art work. Current head of temple is HH Dwitiya peethadhish Gosvami shri 108 shri Kalyanraiji Maharaj of Indore.

• Vanmaaliji temple- This temple also belongs to vallabh sect pushtimarg and is an ancient temple of Lord vanmaali(Krishna). 

• Madanmohanji temple- This temple is a Krishna temple which under vallabh sect only. 

• Yamunaji temple- situated at Pritam poli, Nathdwara, it is a temple dedicated to the Goddess river Yamunaji. It also comes under vallabh sect of pushtimarg.

Geography and Transport
It has an average elevation of 584 metres (1919 ft). Located just 48 km north-east of Udaipur in Rajasthan, this town is easily reached by air, road or nearest rail-head.

Demographics
, Nathdwara had a population of 37,007. Males constitute 52% of the population and females 48%. Nathdwara has an average literacy rate of 73.0%, higher than the national average of 59.5%; male literacy is 80%, and female literacy is 65%. In Nathdwara, 13% of the population is under 6 years of age.

Artists of Nathdwara

Nathdwara Artists are a group of artists working around the precincts of the famous Nathdwara temple in Rajasthan. They are noted for Rajasthani-style paintings, called Pichwai Paintings, belonging to the Mewar School. The paintings revolve around the image of Shrinathji, the enigmatic black-faced figure of Krishna, who is shown holding up Mount Govardhan.  Several authoritative books have been published on this subject.

Apart from Pichwai Paintings, the artists also produce small-scale paintings on paper. Themes from Krishna legend predominate. Mentioned under notable citizens are some of the famous artists who have won accolades/awards in the past.

References

External links

 
Hindu holy cities
Cities and towns in Rajsamand district
Hindu temples in Rajasthan
Tourist attractions in Rajsamand district